Bermuda Triangle is a vertically scrolling shooter released in arcades by SNK in 1987. The player controls a fighter jet and shoots enemies, collects power-ups, and defeats bosses to advance levels.

References

1987 video games
Arcade video games
Bermuda Triangle in fiction
Vertically scrolling shooters
SNK games
SNK Playmore games
PlayStation Network games
Video games developed in Japan